Rabbel II Soter (Nabataean Aramaic:  Rabʾel dī ʾaḥyēy wa-šēzīb ʿammeh, "Rabbel, who gave life and deliverance to his people") was the last ruler of the Nabataean Kingdom, ruling from 70 to 106.

After the death of his father, Malichus II, Rabbel still a child, ascended to the throne. His mother, Shaqilath II,  assumed the regency of the Nabataean Kingdom, during the minority of her son Rabel II in 70-76 AD. His sister Gamilath became queen of the Nabataeans. Rabbel gave himself the Greek title "Soter", meaning "Savior". He reigned with his first wife Queen Gamilath and his second wife Queen Hagaru. Gamilat was a queen in 76–102 CE and Hagru was a queen in 102–106.

After his death in 106, the Roman emperor Trajan faced practically no resistance and conquered the kingdom on 22 March 106. It became the Roman province of Arabia Petraea, with Bosra becoming its provincial capital.

See also
 List of rulers of Nabatea

References

Sources
Taylor, Jane: Petra And the Lost Kingdom of the Nabataeans. I. B. Tauris 2001, p. 73-74

1st-century births
106 deaths
1st-century Nabataean monarchs
2nd-century Nabataean monarchs
Roman client rulers
2nd-century monarchs in the Middle East
2nd-century Arabs
Ancient child monarchs